Penobscot Theatre Company (PTC), is located in Bangor, Maine. It operates year-round in the historic Bangor Opera House, producing theatre works both classic and new. Open for more than 40 years PTC has grown and now typically produces, producing 5 Mainstage shows, two add-On musicals, limited engagement concerts and performances, and several productions produced by their education program: The Dramatic Academy.

The Dramatic Academy is an arts education program

History 

Penobscot Theatre Company has its roots in the Acadia Repertory Theatre founded in 1973 by George Vafiadis and Lou Collier. Acadia Repertory Theatre presented 97 productions in Bangor before Penobscot Theatre Company was incorporated as a 501(c)3 on March 17, 1983. The School For Wives was the first play officially produced by PTC.

George Vafiadis served as PTC's Producing Director from 1983 through 1990. Kenneth Stack was PTC's Artistic Director from 1983 to 1989.

In 1986 the greater Bangor community helped Penobscot Theatre raise $160,000 for the purchase and initial renovation of the historic parish house (built in 1888 at 183 Main Street) that it had been renting from the church next door. The theatre sold the parish house to Merrill Bank in 2004.

Joe Turner Cantu became Artistic Director in 1990 and remained in that position through 1992 when Mark Torres was named Producing Artistic Director and stayed in that position for the next 13 seasons. Under Torres' leadership, the theatre reorganized to operate with paid professionals, tripled the budget and increased attendance to more than 15,000 annually. Torres also increased the theatre's activity to include the annual Maine Shakespeare Festival, which performed on the banks of the Penobscot River for seven summers.

In 1997, Penobscot Theatre Company acquired the Bangor Opera House, located at 131 Main Street, which now serves as the company's base of operations. The Opera House was built in 1920 and is an early example of Art Deco/Egyptian Revival architecture.

In 2005, the board hired Scott R.C. Levy as Producing Artistic Director and he served until mid-2011. Under Levy's leadership, Penobscot Theatre Company toured productions throughout the state of Maine, created the Northern Writes New Play Festival, and restored the façade of the Bangor Opera House.

Upon Levy’s departure, the board instituted a new dual leadership structure, and hired Marcie Bramucci as Managing Director and Bari Newport as Artistic Director.

Bramucci left the company in 2013 and Newport's title was subsequently changed to Producing Artistic Director. Board president, Mary Budd, transitioned off the board and joined Newport in a co-leadership position as executive director. She remained with the company for 5.5 years. Under Newport and Budd's leadership, Penobscot Theatre Company grew from a semi-professional company to the largest non-profit arts organization in the region, with an annual budget of $1.75M.

Today Penobscot Theatre Company operates on an AEA SPT-7/9 contract, serves over 40,000 people a season and serves over 7,000 youth through its robust, longstanding Dramatic Academy. Kathryn Ravenscraft was hired in 2019 as executive director.

References

External links
www.penobscottheatre.org

Culture of Bangor, Maine
Theatre companies in Maine
Tourist attractions in Bangor, Maine